Bahadır Akkuzu (February 3, 1955 – August 6, 2009) was a Turkish singer and musician who was a self-taught guitarist and vocalist.

Biography
Akkuzu began playing shows at the age of 15 and at the age of 17 joined a rock and roll group called "4 Adam". This was followed by a stint in "The Signal" and then a long career as a member of the Turkish/Anatolian psychedelic-progressive rock band Kurtalan Ekspres, which he joined in 1978. He was a contemporary of and worked with the famous Turkish musicians Cem Karaca, Erkin Koray, and Edip Akbayram. His band-mate and friend Barış Manço died in 1999 at the age 56. Akkuzu took over singing duties for the band after his friend died.

He was generally considered an experimental rock musician who cited many western influences, among which were classic rock bands such as Deep Purple, Led Zeppelin, Yes, Emerson, Lake & Palmer, Bad Company, Humble Pie, Genesis, Ten Years After, and Rush.

Death
Akkuzu died of a heart attack on August 6, 2009 and was interred at the Zincirlikuyu Cemetery.

Discography

With Kurtalan Ekspres
 Hal Hal / Eğri Eğri Doğru Doğru Eğri Büğrü Ama Yine De Doğru (1981) (Türküola 239)
 3552 (2003 Sony Müsik)
 Fourteen Numara (1986 Film score)

References

External links
 Kurtalan Ekspres MySpace Page
 blog interview 
 Hit song "Hal Hal" video

1955 births
2009 deaths
Musicians from Istanbul
Turkish singer-songwriters
20th-century Turkish male singers
Progressive rock guitarists
Singers from Istanbul
20th-century guitarists
Burials at Zincirlikuyu Cemetery